Man of the World stylized as MAN of the WORLD is an American international quarterly lifestyle publication concentrating on the modern man. Founded by Alan Maleh in 2012, it is headquartered in New York. It covers style, travel, art, adventure, culture, and craft targeted towards males. The magazine prides itself in its high quality of photographic art and design and offers a tightly curated selection of rare and vintage items for purchase by its readers.

External links
Official website

Magazines established in 2012
Men's magazines published in the United States
Magazines published in New York City
Quarterly magazines published in the United States
Lifestyle magazines published in the United States